The Long Run is the sixth studio album by American rock group the Eagles. It was released in 1979, on Asylum in the United States and the United Kingdom. This was the first Eagles album to feature Timothy B. Schmit, who had replaced founding member Randy Meisner, and the last full studio album to feature Don Felder before his termination from the band in 2001.

This was the band's final studio album for Asylum Records. It also turned out to be their last studio album as the Eagles disbanded in 1980 until 2007's Long Road Out of Eden after the band had reformed in 1994.

Three singles were released from the album, "Heartache Tonight", "The Long Run", and "I Can't Tell You Why".  "Heartache Tonight" reached No. 1 on the singles chart and won a Grammy Award. The album was certified 7× Platinum by the RIAA and has sold more than eight million copies in the US.

Background
The album was originally intended to be a double album. The band could not come up with enough songs and the idea was therefore scrapped. The recording was protracted; they started recording in 1978, and the album took 18 months to record in five different studios, with the album finally released in September 1979. According to Don Henley, the band members were "completely burned out" and "physically, emotionally, spiritually and creatively exhausted" from a long tour when they started recording the album, and they had few songs. However, they managed to put together ten songs for the album, with contribution from their friends J. D. Souther and Bob Seger who co-wrote with Frey and Henley on "Heartache Tonight". (Souther also got songwriting credit on "Teenage Jail" and "The Sad Cafe".)

According to Henley, the title track was in part a response to press articles that said they were "passé" as disco was then dominant and punk emerging, which inspired lines such as "Who is gonna make it/ We'll find out in the long run". He said that the inspiration for the lyrics was also "irony", as they wrote about longevity and posterity while the group "was breaking apart, imploding under the pressure of trying to deliver a worthy follow-up to Hotel California".

Randy Meisner decided to leave the Eagles after an argument in Knoxville, Tennessee, during the Hotel California Tour in June 1977. He was replaced by Timothy B. Schmit, who brought an unfinished song to the band, "I Can't Tell You Why".  Schmit wrote the song based loosely on his own experiences; both Henley and Frey liked the song and they completed the song together.   Joe Walsh also contributed the song "In the City", which was first recorded by Walsh for the movie soundtrack for The Warriors, where it was credited to Walsh, not the Eagles. Don Felder wrote the tune for "The Disco Strangler" using a four-on-the-floor disco beat as the basis for the composition.  Henley wrote the lyrics. Henley intended the song to be an antidote to disco as both he and the rest of the band disliked disco,  which was the most popular musical genre at the time. The song "The Sad Cafe" was inspired by the Troubadour nightclub in Hollywood where the Eagles once played, and also by Dan Tana's restaurant that they frequented, while "The Greeks Don't Want No Freaks" was written as a homage to Sixties "frat rock" such as the song "96 Tears" by ? and the Mysterians.

The album was produced by Bill Szymczyk, although the Eagles were listed as co-producers.

Album pressing 
The original vinyl record pressings of The Long Run (Elektra/Asylum catalog no. 5E-508) had text engraved in the run-out groove of each side, continuing an in-joke trend the band had started with their 1975 album One of These Nights:

 Side one: "Never let your monster lay down"
 Side two: "From the Polack who sailed north" (may be a reference to the producer of the album Bill Szymczyk)

Critical reception
In 1979 Rolling Stone wrote, "Overall, The Long Run is a synthesis of previous macabre Eagles motifs, with cynical new insights that are underlined by slashing rock & roll...(it) is a bitter, wrathful, difficult record, full of piss and vinegar and poisoned expectations. Because it’s steeped in fresh, risky material and unflinching self-examination, it’s also the Eagles’ best work in many, many years." Reviewing the album retrospectively in AllMusic, critic William Ruhlmann wrote that the album was a "major disappointment, even though it sold several million copies and threw off three hit singles," adding that the album "reportedly was planned as a double album before being truncated to a single disc. If these were the keepers, what could the rejects have sounded like?"

Grammys

|-
|  style="width:35px; text-align:center;"|1980 || "Heartache Tonight" || Best Rock Performance by a Duo or Group with Vocal || 
|-

Commercial performance
When released in September 1979, The Long Run debuted at number two on Billboards Pop Albums chart and a week later hit number one. It stood for nine weeks in the number one slot. The Long Run was first certified platinum by the Recording Industry Association of America (RIAA) on February 1, 1980, and reached 7× Platinum status on March 20, 2001. It has sold more than eight million copies in the US.

The album generated three Top 10 singles, "Heartache Tonight", the album's title cut, and "I Can't Tell You Why". Those singles reached No. 1, No. 8 and No. 8 respectively. The band also won a Grammy Award for "Heartache Tonight".

Track listing

Personnel
Eagles
 Don Felder – guitars, organ, vocals
 Glenn Frey – vocals, guitars, keyboards
 Don Henley – vocals, drums, percussion
 Timothy B. Schmit – vocals, bass guitar
 Joe Walsh – vocals, guitars, keyboards

Additional personnel
 Jimmy Buffett – backing vocals on "The Greeks Don't Want No Freaks"
 The Monstertones – backing vocals
 David Sanborn – alto saxophone on "The Sad Café"
 Bob Seger – backing vocals "Heartache Tonight" (not credited in liner notes)
Joe Vitale – piano, electric piano 

Production
The Eagles – co-producers
Bill Szymczyk – producer and engineer 
Ed Mashal – engineer
David Crowther – assistant engineer
Mark Curry – assistant engineer
Phil Jamtaas – assistant engineer
Bob Stringer – assistant engineer
Bob Winder – assistant engineer
Ted Jensen – mixing, remastering
John Kosh – art direction, design
Jim Shea – photography

Long Run Leftovers
It appears that several more songs were submitted for The Long Run, but did not make it. Some of these are included in the collection Selected Works: 1972–1999, with the title “Long Run Leftovers”, though in a barely recognizable form. Joe Walsh later resurrected two of them, which surfaced on his solo albums: “Rivers (of the Hidden Funk)” on There Goes the Neighborhood (1981) and “I Told You So” on You Bought It, You Name It (1983). The music of both of them appear to have been written by Don Felder, with lyrics by Walsh. Felder is also credited for playing guitar on both songs.

Charts

Weekly charts

Year-end charts

Certifications

References

Eagles (band) albums
1979 albums
Elektra Records albums
Asylum Records albums
Albums produced by Bill Szymczyk
Albums recorded at Record Plant (Los Angeles)